Le Colisée is an indoor arena in Chalon-sur-Saône, France.  It is primarily used for basketball games, and it is the home arena of the French Pro A League club Élan Chalon. The arena seats 5,000 people.

History
In 2016, the 2016 FIBA Europe Cup Final Four was held at the Le Colisée, with Élan Chalon functioning as the hosts.

References

Indoor arenas in France
Basketball venues in France
Sports venues in Saône-et-Loire
Sports venues completed in 2001
21st-century architecture in France